Aholcocerus ronkayorum is a moth in the family Cossidae. It is found in Pakistan.

Etymology
The species is named in honour of Laszlo and Gabor Ronkay.

References

Natural History Museum Lepidoptera generic names catalog

Cossinae
Moths described in 2006
Moths of Asia